"If I Survive" is a song by British electronic music group Hybrid, featuring Julee Cruise. It is the second single from their debut studio album, Wide Angle, and was released by Distinct'ive Records on 30 August 1999. The single was the band's biggest commercial success, reaching #52 in the UK Singles Chart, and helped promote the album.

The group continues to perform the song at live events, and the song has since been featured on their 2012 greatest hits album, Classics.

Track listing

UK

Australia & New Zealand

Hong Kong

Charts

Trivia
 The song was used in the PlayStation 2 racing game Kinetica.
 The song (and "I Know") was featured in the American television series CSI: NY.

References

External links
 

1999 songs
Hybrid (British band) songs
Julee Cruise songs